Ahmad Hasan Al Zoubi or Al Zu’bi is a Jordanian columnist, playwright and satirist. He rose to prominence in 2004 after he started to write his weekly column in state-owned newspaper Al Ra'i. The column titled “Sawaleif”, in English “parables” became on the most read columns in Jordan as the writer cynically addresses political and social problems.

Al Zoubi was born in 1975 in the Jordanian border town of Ar-Ramtha north of Jordan and is a member of the Hasanite Al-Zoubi family. He earned a BA in accounting from Jerash Private University in 1998. While at the university, he won several awards on national level for writing short stories.

Career
Al Zoubi worked in sales in a company in the United Arab Emirates. He started his writing career in the Emirati magazine of Ahwal under a satirical column entitled “the other street” from 2000 to 2003. He also published several articles in Al-Khaleej magazine. He came back to Jordan in 2004 and started writing for Al Ra'i newspaper under a satirical column entitled “Sawaleif”, an Arabic word for parables or short stories.

In 2008, Al Zoubi started his website Sawalief, which publishes his banned articles and the works of Jordanian amateur writers.  In 2011 and in the wake of Arab Spring, he wrote the famous play of Al'an Fahimtkum, which he described as a work that 300 million Arabs wrote. 
In 2012, Al Zoubi started cooperation with Kharabeesh which produces his satirical program of Mon3 fe al-Seen, in Arabic “Banned in China”. Al-Zu'bi has also written for Emarat Al Youm newspaper since 2012.

Published works
 Sawalief (parables) 2006
 Al-Mam’out (The featherless bird) 2008
 Awja’ Watan (The pains of the homeland) 2012
 Solo Bleeding 2012

Plays
The political satirical play Al'an Fahimtkum

References

Jordanian writers
1975 births
Living people